Criollos de Caguas  FC is a soccer team that plays in the Liga Nacional de Fútbol de Puerto Rico. The team was founded in 1981. Since then has won multiple titles and participated in international tournaments including a 1986 visit to Portsmouth, England. The team finished third in the LNF 2011 season, sixth in 2012 season and third on 2013 and has been the champions in the PRSL Super Cup 2014, League 2014 and the Super Cup 2015. The Team will make the official debut on the Liga Nacional de Fútbol de Puerto Rico in the 2015 season on Sunday, September 20, 2015. The team plays their home matches in the Asociación Central de Balompie de Puerto Rico in Caguas, Puerto Rico.

Puerto Rico Soccer League
The PRSL current format is a Supercup prior the start of the season. The PRSL consists in 6 teams from all parts of Puerto Rico. The Criollos de Caguas FC won the Supercup 2014 in a dramatic fashion against the Bayamón FC on June 8, 2014 on the 89th minute 2–1.

First Division
February 10, 2017
The First Division team. The coach is Luis Garcia. The current roster:

Club hierarchy
Chairman: José O. Ortiz, MD
President: Kermit Ortiz
Club Treasurer: Hector Santana
Club Secretary: Joan Morales

International Friendlies

2017
March 12 - Criollos De Caguas FC [#] v  Scholars International SC [#]

Achievements

Puerto Rico Soccer League: 
Champions: 2014

Liga Nacional de Fútbol de Puerto Rico:
Champions: 2015

Domestic Cups

Super Copa de Fútbol Gigante
Champions: 2014

Excellence Cup
Champions: 2015

Bayamon Cup:
Champions: 2015 , 2016

Copa Mickey Jimenez: 
Champions: 2016

References

External links
Official Fan Page: https://www.facebook.com/CriollosdeCaguasFC

Official Web Site: https://web.archive.org/web/20161018225830/http://www.criollosfc.com/

Football clubs in Puerto Rico
Puerto Rico Soccer League teams
1983 establishments in Puerto Rico
Liga Nacional de Fútbol de Puerto Rico teams